Takeshi Kaneshiro Tree is a bishop wood located on Mr. Brown Avenue, Chishang Township, Taitung County, Taiwan. Because of advertisements made in June 2013 by EVA Air with Takeshi Kaneshiro in this tree, it was named Takeshi Kaneshiro Tree. Since then, this tree has become a famous landmark attracting countless tourists to visit this place like a pilgrimage. It is estimated that the annual output value of tourism will reach NT$500 million. However, after the increase of tourists, a small number of people littering and destroying of crops by trampling has caused concern by local citizens to the extent that local farmers wanted to cut down the tree.

Takeshi Kaneshiro tree fell during Typhoon Matmo on July 23, 2014. After treatment by Japanese and Taiwanese arborists, the tree has been raised back and gradually restored.

See also
 List of individual trees

References

Individual trees in Taiwan
Taitung County

External links